This is a list of episodes for Avataro Sentai Donbrothers, a Japanese tokusatsu television drama. It is the third series in the franchise released in Japan's Reiwa Era and the 46th entry of Toei's long-running Super Sentai series produced by TV Asahi. The series also acts as a sequel for the previous entry, Kikai Sentai Zenkaiger.

Episodes

References

Donbrothers
Avataro Sentai Donbrothers